André Parmentier (22 February 1912 - 28 August 1978) was a French politician.

Parmentier was born in Calais.  He represented the French Section of the Workers' International (SFIO) in the National Assembly from 1956 to 1958.

References

1912 births
1978 deaths
People from Calais
Politicians from Hauts-de-France
French Section of the Workers' International politicians
Deputies of the 3rd National Assembly of the French Fourth Republic
French military personnel of World War II